Chiamaka Cynthia Nnadozie  (born 8 December 2000) is a Nigerian footballer who plays as a goalkeeper for Paris FC in the French Division 1 Féminine and the Nigeria national team.

Club career
Nnadozie signed for Rivers Angels at the start of the 2016 season.

In 2019 Nnadozie was instrumental for Rivers Angels 2019–2020 Season NWPL league win. 

On January 22, 2020 she signed for the French side Paris FC on 18 month deal.

International career

During the 2018 FIFA U-20 Women's World Cup Nnadozie played all 4 matches. Against Haiti she received the "Dare to Shine" Player of the Match award for her good performance. Not much after the U-20 Tournament she was also selected for the 2018 Africa Women Cup of Nations where she stayed on the bench for all five matches, then at the 2019 Women WAFU Cup she was in goal for the Super Falcons spectacular performance.

At age 19, Nnadozie was named to the senior national team (commonly known as the Super Falcons) to compete at the 2019 FIFA Women's World Cup in France. As Nigeria's starting goalkeeper in the team's 2–0 victory over Korea, Nnadozie became the youngest goalkeeper to keep a clean sheet at the World Cup.

After the World Cup, Nnadozie again helped the Falconets to Gold medal at the African Games in Morocco saving three penalties in the shootout against Cameroon.

Honours
 Rivers Angels
 Nigerian Women's Championship: 2016
 Nigerian Women's Cup: 2016, 2017, 2018
Nigeria
African Women's Championship: 2018
 African Games: 2019
Individual
IFFHS Africa's Best Woman Goalkeeper: 2019 
IFFHS World's Best Woman Goalkeeper: 2019 (nominee) 
African Women's Footballer of the Year: 2019 (nominee) 
NFF Awards Young Player of the Year : 2018 (nominee)

References

External links
 

Nigerian women's footballers
2000 births
Living people
Women's association football goalkeepers
2019 FIFA Women's World Cup players
Nigeria women's international footballers
Rivers Angels F.C. players
African Games medalists in football
African Games gold medalists for Nigeria
Competitors at the 2019 African Games
Igbo sportspeople